Homme Fatale is a South Korean historical drama film released on 10 July 2019. Set in the Joseon Dynasty, it is a historical comedy film that depicts the life of Heo-saek, the dynasty's first male courtesan.

The film was directed by Nam Dae-joong, and stars Lee Jun-ho and Jung So-min. It grossed  worldwide.

Cast
 Lee Jun-ho as Huh Saek
 Jung So-min as Hae Won
 Choi Gwi-hwa as Yook-gam
 Ye Ji-won 
 Gong Myung
 Baek Joo-hee as Yeol-nyeo

See also 

Gisaeng

References

External links 
 
 
 
 
 

2019 films
2010s historical films
2010s Korean-language films
Films set in the Joseon dynasty
South Korean historical films
2010s South Korean films
CJ Entertainment films